Malika Handa (born 20 March 1995) is a deaf Indian professional chess player and the first Indian woman to win a gold medal in the International Deaf Chess Championship. 2 GOLD Medals in World Deaf open chess championship n Asian women deaf championship. 4 Silver Medals in World Deaf blitz Chess championship 2018, Asian Disabled chess championship 2017 she has won the National Chess Championship of the Deaf eight times. This championship is organised by the All India Sports Council of the Deaf. Malika is also a national awardee for best sportsperson 2019 

She is National Youth Awardee 2019-2020 on 16 jan 2023 by Govt of India

Early life 
Malika was born in Jalandhar, Punjab, to Suresh and Renu Handa. She was not born deaf but lost her hearing and speech when she was one year old. Now, she lives with a 90 per cent hearing disability. She was introduced to chess in 2010 by her father when he brought home a chessboard. She was still a student in school. Malika quickly developed an interest in this game. Her chess expertise helped her secure a seat in a mainstream college.

Professional life 

Malika began to play chess when she was 15 years. She developed a passion for the game and she soon began to outplay her peers. She has won the national deaf chess championship six times. She has faced a lot of problems in her professional life and the biggest problem of all was the lack of aid from government. In the past nine years of playing, she has won more titles than those who have been playing for longer. She is the only woman from Punjab to have represented the state nine times in national championships. She has won one gold and two silvers in world deaf chess championship and as well as in Asian deaf chess championship.

Medals

International medals 

 Silver - ICCD World Deaf Blitz Chess Championship (2018)
 Silver - Asian Chess Championship for Disabled (2017)
 Gold - ICCD World Open Individual Deaf Chess Championship (2016)
 Silver - ICCD 4th World Individual Blitz Deaf Championship (Ladies) (2016)
 Gold - ICCD 3rd Asian Individual Chess Championship for Deaf (2015)
 Silver - ICCD 1st Asian Open Deaf Chess Blitz Championship (2015)

National medals 

 Gold - 23nd National Chess Championship of the Deaf (2022) 

 Gold - 22nd National Chess Championship of the Deaf (2020)
 Gold - 21st National Chess Championship of the Deaf (2018)
 Gold - 20th National Chess Championship of the Deaf (2017)
 Gold - 19th National Chess Championship of the Deaf (2017)
 Gold - 18th National Chess Championship of the Deaf (2016)
 Gold - 17th National Chess Championship of the Deaf (2013)
 Gold - National Chess Championship of the Deaf (2012)

References

External links 

 Malika Handa chess player - news clip: https://www.youtube.com/watch?v=S_y2i1ECOcc
 Specially abled chess player - news clip: https://www.youtube.com/watch?v=zMAy8WIh3uM&t=16s
 Jalandhar's chess player - Hindi news clip: https://www.youtube.com/watch?v=zT0cNzN33bc

Indian female chess players
1995 births
Living people